Luis Martínez (born January 20, 1980) is a former professional baseball pitcher. He has pitched four games in Major League Baseball, all as a starting pitcher for the Milwaukee Brewers during the 2003 season, and two seasons with the Chunichi Dragons of Nippon Professional Baseball in 2005–06. He most recently pitched for the Coastal Bay Thunder of United League Baseball in 2010. Listed at 6' 6", 200 lb., Martínez bats and throws left-handed.

Career
Born in Santo Domingo, Dominican Republic, Martínez was signed as a 16-year-old amateur free agent by the Brewers in 1996. He was assigned to their minor league complex, spending six years in the minors (1998–2003) before joining the big club in late September 2003. He posted a 0–3 record with a 9.92 ERA in four starts for Milwaukee, allowing 18 runs on 25 hits, while striking out 10 and walking 15 in 16.1 innings of work.

Following his majors stint, Martínez played in the St. Louis Cardinals and Colorado Rockies minor league systems in 2004. While in St. Louis, he was traded to the Rockies the same transaction that brought Larry Walker to the Cardinals. He became a free agent after the 2004 season and signed with the Arizona Diamondbacks. Prior to the start of the 2005 season, he went to Japan, where he played two seasons for the Dragons. In his two NPB seasons, he went 14–13 with a 3.82 ERA.

He later pitched in the Dominican Winter League and for the 2008 Saraperos de Saltillo of the Mexican League. After sitting out the 2009 season, Martínez split the 2010 season between the Thunder and the Rio Grande Valley WhiteWings, both of ULB.

See also
List of MLB players from the Dominican Republic

References

Sources

Retrosheet

1980 births
Beloit Snappers players
Chunichi Dragons players
Coastal Bend Thunder players
Colorado Springs Sky Sox players
Dominican Republic expatriate baseball players in Japan
Dominican Republic expatriate baseball players in Mexico
Dominican Republic expatriate baseball players in Taiwan
Dominican Republic expatriate baseball players in the United States
Helena Brewers players
High Desert Mavericks players
Huntsville Stars players
Indianapolis Indians players

Living people
Major League Baseball pitchers
Major League Baseball players from the Dominican Republic
Memphis Redbirds players
Mexican League baseball pitchers
Milwaukee Brewers players
Nippon Professional Baseball pitchers
Ogden Raptors players
Rio Grande Valley WhiteWings players
Saraperos de Saltillo players
Tennessee Smokies players